The United States Ambassador to Nepal is the official representative of the government of the United States to the government of Nepal.

Dean R. Thompson is the current Ambassador to Nepal, and presented his credentials to the Nepali president Bidhya Devi Bhandari on October 21, 2022.

List of US Ambassadors to Nepal

See also
Nepal – United States relations
Foreign relations of Nepal
Ambassadors of the United States

References
United States Department of State: Background notes on Nepal

External links
 United States Department of State: Chiefs of Mission for Nepal
 United States Department of State: Nepal
 United States Embassy in Kathmandu

Nepal
 
United States